Marion High School may refer to:

United States
Marion High School (Alabama) — Marion, Alabama
Marion High School (Arkansas) — Marion, Arkansas
Marion High School (Illinois) — Marion, Illinois
Marion High School (Indiana) — Marion, Indiana
Marion High School (Iowa) — Marion, Iowa
Marion High School (Kansas) — Marion, Kansas
Marion High School (Louisiana) — Marion, Louisiana
Marian High School (Bloomfield Hills, Michigan) — Bloomfield Hills, Michigan
Marion High School (Marion, Michigan) — Marion, Michigan
Marion Local High School (Maria Stein, Ohio)
Marion High School (South Carolina) — Marion, South Carolina
Marion High School (South Dakota) — Marion, South Dakota
Marion High School (Texas) — Marion, Texas
Marion Senior High School (Virginia) — Marion, Virginia
Marion High School (Wisconsin) — Marion, Wisconsin
Marion County High School (Alabama) — Guin, Alabama
Marion County High School (Kentucky) — Lebanon, Kentucky
Marion County High School (Missouri) — Philadelphia, Missouri
Marion County High School (Tennessee) — Jasper, Tennessee
North Marion High School (Florida) — Citra, Florida
North Marion High School (Aurora, Oregon)
North Marion High School (West Virginia) — Rachel, West Virginia, postal address Farmington, West Virginia
West Marion High School — Foxworth, Mississippi
Marion Center Area High School — Marion Center, Pennsylvania
Marion L. Steele High School — Amherst, Ohio
Marion-Franklin High School — Columbus, Ohio
Marion Military Institute — Marion, Alabama
East Marion High School — Columbia, Mississippi
Litchville-Marion High School — Marion, North Dakota

Australia
Marion High School (South Australia) — Clovelly Park, South Australia (Closed in 1996)